Jerry or Gerry Johnson may refer to:

Sportsmen
Jerry Johnson (baseball) (1943–2021), Major League Baseball pitcher
Jerry Johnson (basketball player) (born 1982), naturalised Kazakhstani basketball player
Jerry Johnson (basketball coach) (1918–2021), American basketball coach
Jerry Johnson (defensive tackle) (born 1977), American football player
Jerry Johnson (running back) (1894–1947), American football player

Others
Jerry Johnson, candidate in the United States Senate elections, 1974
Jerry Johnson (politician) (born 1942), member of the Nebraska Legislature, elected in 2012
Jerry A. Johnson, President of the National Religious Broadcasters
Gerry Johnson (1918–1990), actress

See also
Jeremy Johnson (disambiguation)
Jeremiah Johnson (disambiguation)
Jerome Johnson (disambiguation)
Gerald Johnson (disambiguation)
Gerard Johnson (disambiguation)